This is a list of Arabic-language and other newspapers published in the Arab world. The Arab newspaper industry started in the early 19th century with the Iraqi newspaper Journal Iraq published by Ottoman Wali, Dawud Pasha, in Baghdad in 1816.

International Arab papers

Al-Arab (United Kingdom)
Al-Hayat (United Kingdom)
Al-Quds al-Arabi (United Kingdom)
Asharq Alawsat (United Kingdom)
Hoona London (United Kingdom)
Oz Arab Media (Australia)

Algeria

Algerian newspapers in Arabic 

Echorouk (Arabic, English)
El Ayem El Djazairia
El Djazaïr
El Djoumhouria
El Heddaf
El Khabar (Arabic, English, French)
El Massa

Algerian newspapers in French 

Alger Hebdo (French)
Alger républicain (French)
Les Annonces Spécialisées (French)
L'Authentique (French)
Le Buteur (French)
Le Carrefour d'Algérie (French)
Le Citoyen (French)
Compétition (French)
Côte Ouest (French)
Le Courrier d'Algérie (French)
Les Débats (French)
La Depeche (French)
La Dépêche de Kabylie (French)
L'Echo d'Oran (French)
El Acil (French)
El Moudjahid (French)
El Watan (French)
L'époque (French)
L'Est Républicain (French)
L'Expression (French)
La Gazette d'Alger (French)
La gazette des Finances (French)
L'index (French)
Infosoir (French)
It-mag (French)
Le Jeune Indépendant (French)
Le jour d'Algérie (French)
Liberté (French)
Liberté économie (French)
Liberté FOOT (French)
Maracana Hebdo (French)
Le Maghreb (French)
Le Mobile GSM (French)
La Nouvelle République (French)
Les Nouvelles Confidences (French)
Ouest Tribune (French)
Le Quotidien d'Oran (French)
Le Soir d'Algerie (French)
Transaction d'Algérie (French)
La Tribune (French)
La Voix de l'Oranie (French)

Bahrain

Akhbar Al Khaleej
Al Ayam
Al-Wasat
Al Watan
Bahrain Mirror (Arabic, English)
Daily Tribune (English)
Gulf Daily News (English)
Gulf Madhyamam (Malayalam)

Egypt

Akhbar el-Yom
Akher Saa
Akher Saa Al Musawara
Al-Ahram
Al-Ahram Hebdo (French)
Al-Ahram Weekly (English)
Al Ahrar
Al Akhbar
Al Alam Al Youm
Al-Arabi
Al Aroussa
Al-Dustour
Al Gomhuria
Al-Masry Al-Youm
Al-Maydān
Al Messa
Al Moayd
Al-Osboa
Al Shaab
Al Shorouk
Al Tahrir
Al-Wafd
Al-Waqa'i' al-Masriyya (Arabic, Turkish)
Aqidati
Arev (Armenian)
Daily News Egypt (English)
The Daily Star (English)
Egypt News (English)
Egypt Today (English, monthly)
The Egyptian Gazette (English)
El Fagr
El-Ghad
Housaper (Armenian)
Middle East Times (English)
Le Progrès Egyptien (French)
Tchahagir (Armenian)
Watani
Youm7

Eritrea
Eritrea al-Haditha

Iran
Kayhan Al Arabi

Iraq

Al Anbaa
Al Mada
Al-Mashriq
Al-Mutamar
Al Sabaah
Awena (Kurdish)
Azzaman
Bahra
Hawlati (Kurdish)
Iraq Today (English)
The Kurdish Globe
Rozhnama (Kurdish)
SOMA Digest (English)
Xebat (Kurdish)
Journal Iraq (Arabic)

Israel

Al-Ittihad
Kul al-Arab
Al-Madina

Jordan

Ad-Dustour
Al-Ahali
Al Anbat
Al-Arab Al-Yawm
Al Ghad
Al-liwa
Al Ra'i
Assabeel
The Jordan Times (English)
Shihan
The Star (English)

Kuwait

Al-Anbaa (Ar)
Al Kuwaitiya (Ar)
al-Qabas
Al Rai 
al-Watan
Alwasat
Arab Times (English)
Kuwait Times (English)
Taleea
Gulf Madhyamam (Malayalam)

Lebanon

Ad Diyar
Al-Ahd Ul'Jadid
al-Akhbar
Al Amal
 Al Anwar
al-Balad
Al-Intiqad
Al Joumhouria
Al-Kalima
Al-Kifah al-Arabi
Al Liwaa
Al-Massira
 Al-Mustaqbal
Al-Nahar
Al-Ousbou' al-Arabi
Al-Safir
Al-Sharq
Al-Waie
Al-Watan al- Arabi
Beirut Times
Daily Star (English)
Hamzat Wassel (Arabic - French)
Monday Morning (English)
L'Orient Le Jour (French)
La Revue du Liban (French)

Libya
al-Fajr al-Jadid
al-Jamahiriyah
Al-Shams
al-Zahf Al-Akhdar

Mauritania
Akhbar Nouakchott
Nouakchott Info (French)

Morocco

al-Alam
al-Ayam (Morocco)
al-Jarida al-Maghribia (French)
as-Sabah
Attajdid
Aujourd'hui Le Maroc (French)
Bayane al-Yaoume
L'Économiste (French)
La Gazette du Maroc (French)
Libération (Morocco) (French)
Le Matin (French)
Morocco Times
La Nouvelle Tribune (French)
L'Opinion (French)
La Verité (French)
La Vie Éco (French)

Oman

Al Watan
Ashabiba
Oman Observer (English)
Oman Tribune (English)
Times of Oman (English)
Gulf Madhyamam (Malayalam)

Palestine

Al Ayyam
al-Hayat al-Jadida
Al Karmil
Al Manar
Al Massar
Al Quds
Filasteen al-Muslimah

Qatar

Al Raya
Al Sharq
al-Watan
Gulf Times (English)
The Peninsula (English)
Qatar Journal (English)
Qatar Tribune (English)
Gulf Madhyamam (Malayalam)

Saudi Arabia

Al Eqtisadiah (Arabia)
 Al Jazirah (Arabic)
 Al Madina
Al-Riyadh (Arabic)
Al-Watan (Arabic)
 Al Yaum
Arab News (English)
Naseej
Okaz
Saudi Gazette (English)
Gulf Madhyamam (Malayalam)

Somalia

Dawan 
Yool (Somali)
Ogaal Newspaper (Somali)
Banadir (English)
Jamhuuriya (Somali)
Geeska Afrika 
Codka Shacabka Official (Puntland)
Kaaha-Bari (Puntland)
Saxansaxo 
Somaliland Today 
Waaberi (English)
Waaheen (Somali)
Hubaal (Somali)
Warsugan (Somali)
Saxafi (Somali)
Foore (Somali)
Haatuf (Somali)
Sahan (Somali)

South Sudan
Salaam Junub Sudan
Al-Watan

Sudan
Adaraweesh (magazine)
Al Rayaam (daily)

Syria

Al-Ayam
al-Furat
Al Jamahir
Al-Ouruba
Al Thawra
Al-Watan
Al-Wehda
Syria Times (English)
Syria Today (English)
Tishreen

Tunisia

Al-Chourouk
Al-Horria
As-Sabah
Elkhabar, Journal Électronique
Es-Sahafa
L'Économiste Maghrébin (French)
La Presse de Tunisie (French)
Le Quotidien (French)
Le Renouveau  (French)
LeTemps (French)
Tunis Hebdo (French)
Le Soir de Tunisie (Arabic)

Turkey

Daily Sabah (printed edition in English, online edition in Arabic)

United Arab Emirates

al-Bayan
Al-Ittihad
Emirates Business 24/7 (English)
Gulf News (English)
Khaleej Times (English)
The National (English)
Gulf Madhyamam (Malayalam)

Yemen

Al Ayyam
Al Jumhuriya
Al-Thawra
Yemen Observer (English)
Yemen Times (English)

See also 
 List of Arabic-language newspapers published in the United States

References

Notes and references 
 Arab press. pickyournewspaper.com.
 Newspapers. arab2.com.
 Arabic news. arabic-radio-tv.com.
 Arabic newspapers, Arab news. newoxxo.com.
 Periodicals. Zentrum Moderner Orient.

 
Arab
Newspapers
Arabic